The Happy Prince is a 2018 biographical drama film about Oscar Wilde, written and directed by Rupert Everett in his directorial debut. The film stars Everett, Colin Firth, Colin Morgan, Emily Watson, Edwin Thomas and Tom Wilkinson. It  premiered at the 2018 Sundance Film Festival, and was shown at the 2018 BFI Flare: London LGBT Film Festival. At the 9th Magritte Awards, it received a nomination in the category of Best Foreign Film.

The film's title alludes to the children's story by Oscar Wilde, The Happy Prince and Other Tales, which Wilde would read aloud to his children. The film was released in Italy on 12 April 2018, in the United Kingdom on 15 June 2018 and in the United States on 10 October 2018 to positive reviews from critics.

Plot
1897. Oscar Wilde has just been released from prison after serving his sentence for gross indecency. Separated from his wife and children, he arrives in Dieppe, where old friends Reggie Turner and Robert Ross await him. Wilde assumes the alias of Sebastian Melmoth and tries to rebuild his life: he vainly writes to his wife Constance Lloyd to try to make peace with her. He is recognised by some young Englishmen, who taunt him and pursue him into a church; he defends himself violently, then receives severe warnings from the police.

Oscar then reunites with his old lover Bosie Douglas, angering Robbie, whose secret love for him has never been reciprocated. Oscar and Bosie flee together to Naples, where they live for some time in a house in Posillipo, leading a libertine life. Soon Bosie's mother ceases to send her son his allowance – she is willing to resume payments and give a £200 payoff to Oscar if the two lovers separate. Despite Oscar's anger, they give in and separate. Shortly afterwards Constance, who had forbidden Oscar any contact with Bosie, dies from complications following surgery, and Oscar is denied any contact with their two children.

Now incapable of writing, Oscar takes refuge in Paris, where he lives off his wits and the charity of his old supporters. He meets Reggie and Robbie again and shortly thereafter he finds Bosie, who recently received a large inheritance on the death of his father; Bosie angrily refuses to help him. Meanwhile, the writer begins to show strange symptoms that he attributes to mussel poisoning, suspecting however that it may be syphilis. He meets two poor brothers with whom he shares misery: the elder becomes his favourite, while the younger wants to hear the fairy tale The Happy Prince, which the writer always told his children.

Oscar's illness worsens and he receives a painful surgical operation to treat an abscess in his ear. His precarious physical state causes post-operative infections. With his last strength Oscar asks for an extreme Catholic unction, only to die surrounded by the few friends he has left. At the funeral Robbie complains to Bosie that he was a hypocrite, because he mourns the death of the man who had always loved him and whom he had abandoned without showing any gratitude. Bosie replies that these words are dictated by jealousy, and that only he will be remembered alongside Oscar Wilde, while Robbie will be forgotten.

The film's closing headlines state that Bosie died alone and penniless in 1945, while Robbie, who died in 1918, was buried in Oscar's own grave. Oscar was pardoned in 2017 together with other people convicted of homosexual offences.

Cast 
 Rupert Everett as Oscar Wilde
 Colin Firth as Reggie Turner
 Colin Morgan as Lord Alfred "Bosie" Douglas
 Emily Watson as Constance Lloyd
 Tom Wilkinson as Fr Dunne
 Anna Chancellor as Mrs Arbuthnot
 Edwin Thomas as Robbie Ross
 Béatrice Dalle as Café Manager
 Julian Wadham as Mr Arbuthnot
 John Standing as Dr Tucker
 André Penvern as Mr Dupoirier
 Tom Colley as Maurice Gilbert
 Stephen M. Gilbert as Paine
 Alister Cameron as Mr Howard
 Benjamin Voisin as Jean

Production 
Principal photography on the film began in mid-September 2016 in Bavaria, Germany. Filming was also done in France, Belgium and Italy. BBC Films and Lionsgate UK were some of the co-producers of the film, with the latter also handling UK distribution.
Everett's third autobiographical book To the End of the World - Travels with Oscar Wilde (2020) consists in large part of reflections on the preparation and production of this film, recounting many difficulties which occurred. During one of the budgetary problems Firth agreed to forego his fee.

Reception
The website's critical consensus reads, "A passion project for writer, director, and star Rupert Everett, The Happy Prince pays effective tribute to Oscar Wilde with a poignant look at his tragic final days." On Metacritic, the film has a weighted average score of 64 out of 100, based on 26 critics, indicating "generally favorable reviews".

The BBC's Alan Yentob produced a TV documentary of the story of Everett's long journey in obtaining funding and support for the film. The documentary took some five years to make, and was completed in 2018, after the film's premiere.

Awards and nominations

References

External links 
 
 The Happy Prince—(2018) Non-commercial review and in-depth analysis.

2018 films
2010s historical drama films
British biographical drama films
2018 biographical drama films
British historical drama films
British LGBT-related films
Biographical films about poets
Biographical films about writers
Cultural depictions of Oscar Wilde
Gay-related films
LGBT-related films based on actual events
Films based on biographies
Drama films based on actual events
LGBT-related drama films
2018 LGBT-related films
2018 directorial debut films
Films shot in Bavaria
Films shot in Belgium
Films shot in France
Films shot in Italy
BBC Film films
Biographical films about LGBT people
2010s English-language films
2010s British films